There are several places with the name Ilfracombe:

 Ilfracombe, a small coastal town on the North Devon coast in the South West region of the United Kingdom
 Ilfracombe, Queensland, a town in the outback of Queensland, Australia
Ilfracombe, KwaZulu-Natal, a coastal rural village on the South Coast of KwaZulu-Natal, South Africa
 an earlier name for the township of Beauty Point, Tasmania, Australia